The 1857 Gate (or Class of 1857 Gate) is a triple-arched gate on the Harvard University campus, in Cambridge, Massachusetts, United States. According to Harvard Magazine, "members of the class were killed on both sides of the fight in the Civil War", making the gate "a very touching memorial to the unbroken bonds of friendship that this class had". Students on both sides helped fund the gate. It has a Latin inscription from Horace's Odes.

The gate was relocated 40 feet in 1924. It is on axis with the 1876 Gate.

References

External links
 

Gates in the United States
Harvard University